Clive (Frederick William) Egleton (1927–2006) was a British author of spy novels.

He enlisted in the Royal Armoured Corps in 1945 to train as a tank driver while still underage. He was subsequently commissioned into the South Staffordshire Regiment for whom he served in India, Hong Kong, Germany, Egypt, Cyprus, The Persian Gulf and East Africa. He retired in 1975 with the rank of lieutenant colonel.

He was elected to Arreton Parish Council on the Isle of Wight in 2005 .

His novel Seven Days to a Killing was filmed as The Black Windmill, starring Michael Caine. Escape to Athena is a novelization of the 1979 movie of the same name.

Bibliography

Novels (as Clive Egleton)
Seven Days to a Killing [1973]
 The Bormann Brief [1974]
The October Plot [1974]
Skirmish [1975]
State Visit [1976]
The Mills Bomb [1978]
Backfire [1979]
The Winter Touch [1981]
A Falcon for the Hawks [1982]
The Russian Enigma [1983]
A Conflict of Interests [1984]
Troika [1984]
A Different Drummer [1985]
Picture of the Year [1987]
Gone Missing [1988]
Death of a Sahib [1989]
In the Red [1990]
Last Act [1991]
A Double Deception [1994]

Garnett novels (as Clive Egleton)
A Piece of Resistance [1970] published in US as Never Surrender [2004]
Last Post for a Partisan [1971] published in US as The Sleeper [1971]
The Judas Mandate [1972] published in US as The Last Refuge [2006]

Peter Ashton novels (as Clive Egleton)
Hostile Intent [1993]
A Killing in Moscow [1994]
Death Throes [1995]
Warning Shot [1996]
A Lethal Involvement [1996]
Blood Money [1997]
Dead Reckoning [1999]
The Honey Trap [2000]
One Man Running [2001]
Cry Havoc [2003]
Assassination Day [2004]
The Renegades [2005]

Novels (writing as Patrick Blake)
Escape to Athena [1979]
Double Griffin [1981] aka The Skorzeny Project [1981]

Novels (writing as John Tarrant)
A Spy's Ransom-2003
The Rommel Plot [1977]
The Clauberg Trigger [1978]
China Gold [1982] aka Operation Sovereign [1998]

References

English spy fiction writers
2006 deaths
1927 births
20th-century English novelists
Royal Armoured Corps soldiers
British Army personnel of World War II
South Staffordshire Regiment officers